Bcuz of U is a 2004 Filipino romantic anthology film, starring Kristine Hermosa, Diether Ocampo, Heart Evangelista, Geoff Eigenmann, Hero Angeles and Sandara Park.

It is loosely based on the 1964 UK drama film The Yellow Rolls-Royce, which also adopted the idea of using a car as a device to tell the story from the 1947 German drama film In Those Days (German: In jenen Tagen).

Synopsis
A runaway bride returns, a woman falls for her worst nightmare and two opposites come together in this trio of romantic tales. In the first story, Ria (Kristine Hermosa) tries to win back the man (Diether Ocampo) she left at the altar. In tale two, solitary Cara (Heart Evangelista) meets Mr. Wrong (Geoff Eigenmann) -- or is he? And in the final yarn, a tour guide (Hero Angeles) meets a girl (Sandara Park) who pretends to be a famous actress.

Plot

First story
Ria (Kristine Hermosa) and RJ (Diether Ocampo) share the perfect relationship until she did not show up on their wedding. Years after, she decided to win him back. But the indecisive and the new RJ is now the most sought-after model in town. Will their love prevail over the pain they've caused each other?

Second story
Cara (Heart Evangelista) never took a chance on falling in love because she believes that it will only break her heart. That was until she meets Roni (Geoff Eigenmann) but only to find out that he is the kind of man she has been trying to avoid. Will she take the risk this time?

Third story
Louie (Hero Angeles), a tourist guide, meets April (Sandara Park), a Korean girl who got lost in the city and is left with no choice but to pretend that she is a famous actress in her hometown only to survive. Will it be possible for two very different individuals find home in one another?

Cast
Kristine Hermosa as Ria 
Diether Ocampo as RJ 
Heart Evangelista as Cara 
Geoff Eigenmann as Roni 
Hero Angeles as Louie 
Sandara Park as April 
Nikki Valdez as Lee  
Desiree Del Valle as Stella  
Ilonah Jean   
Luis Alandy
Joshua Dionisio   
Gerald Madrid   
Aiza Marquez  
Pen Medina   
Susan Africa   
Yayo Aguila
Pokwang as Tiya Pards

Soundtrack
The theme song, "Because of You" was composed by Keith Martin and originally released as a duet with Kyla, later originally by Paolo Santos, was performed by Gary Valenciano for the film. Also, this song was performed by Martin Nievera for the 2008 Koreanovela Coffee Prince and Jay R for the Philippine adaptation of the same title that were both aired on GMA Network.

Trivia
Diether Ocampo and Kristine Hermosa from Sana'y Wala Nang Wakas since it ended on July 9, Geoff Eigenmann and Heart Evangelista from Hiram since July 12 as its replacement but Hero Angeles and Sandara Park were the SCQ lead actors as they both remained in SCQ Reload: OK Ako!. Also, this was Ocampo's first and only film with Hermosa (since All My Life released 6 months later on May 26 as her solo actress, where she played Louie). Both of them were Jericho Rosales' former boyfriends.

References

External links

2004 films
2004 romantic comedy films
Films directed by Cathy Garcia-Molina
Star Cinema films
2000s Tagalog-language films
2004 directorial debut films
Philippine romantic comedy films